The Namheung Line (南興線, Nankō-sen) was a  narrow gauge railway line of the Chōsen Railway (Chōtetsu) of colonial-era Korea, located in South Hamgyeong Province, serving an industrial area south of the city of Hamheung.

History
The Chōsen Forestry Railway extended its Hamnam Line from Oro to Jangpung on 25 August 1923, and at the same time opened West Hamheung Station between Hamheung and Heungsang,  from Hamheung.; later that year, it merged with five other companies to form the Chōsen Railway. Eleven years later, this new station would become the starting point for a new line to serve factories being opened to the south of the city. The first section, running  from West Hamheung to Cheongiri, was opened on 11 May 1934. Two years later the line was extended, first with a  section from Cheongiri to Naeho on 5 March, followed by another  section from Naeho to Seohojin on the Chōsen Government Railway's Hamgyeong Line opened on 15 December. The Sinheung Railway was absorbed by Chōtetsu on 22 April 1938, which continued to operate the line until the end of the Pacific War.

After the establishment of North Korea and the nationalisation of its railways, the Namheung Line was renamed Sŏho Line by the Korean State Railway, which subsequently rebuilt the section between Unjung and Seohojin on a new, shorter alignment.

Services
In the November 1942 timetable, the last issued prior to the start of the Pacific War, Chōtetsu operated the following schedule of commuter services:

Route

References

Rail transport in North Korea
Rail transport in Korea
Korea under Japanese rule
Defunct railway companies of Japan
Defunct railway companies of Korea
Chosen Railway